The National Recreation Foundation (NRF) is a non-profit organization dedicated to providing and encouraging youth with recreational activities to improve their quality of life. The Foundation also seeks to promote healthy lifestyles in communities across the United States by partnering with local, state and national agencies. The Foundation was begun during World War I as a way to provide men in the military with recreational activities while they were on the homefront. Today, some of its goals including proving grant money to projects that are in line with their mission as well as awarding the Robert W. Crawford Achievement Prize to people who make significant contributions to the recreation field by helping at-risk youth.

History 
During World War I, the National Recreation Foundation began as the War Camp Community Services (WCCS), Inc. Its goal was to provide military men on the homefront with recreational activities. After the War, the Foundation was organized in 1919 and became the NRF.

In 1995, the NRF changed its mission to focus on promoting healthy lifestyles in at-risk youth.

Mission and achievements 
As a non-profit organization, the NRF is dedicated to providing and encouraging at-risk youth with recreational activities to improve their quality of life. The Foundation has worked at improving mental, physical, and social health through recreational activities. It also seeks to promote healthy lifestyles in communities across the United States by partnering with local, state and national agencies.

One of its goals includes providing grant money to projects that are in line with their mission. The NRF has been giving grants since 1965. The members of the board of trustees are the ones who seek out recipients of the grants, which is a unique thing about the NRF. In the year 2016, the National Recreation Foundation donated $1,384,445 to charities that support their mission.

They also award the Robert W. Crawford Achievement Prize to people who make significant contributions to the recreation field by helping at-risk youth.

In 2010-2011 the NRF gave out grants to 36 programs for nearly $2 million to support non-profit organizations and government agencies in the United States.

References 

Charities based in Illinois
Sports charities